Eardiston is a village in Worcestershire, England.
The village of Eardiston lies in the valley of the river Teme between Great Witley and Tenbury Wells.

Villages in Worcestershire